Pembina Gorge State Recreation Area is a unit of the North Dakota state park system located along the Pembina River,  west of Walhalla. The area offers river kayaking and multi-use trails for hiking, horseback riding, mountain biking, and off-road vehicles.

Ecology
The Pembina Gorge is home to the highest numbers and concentrations of rare species known in North Dakota. These include 21 animal species and 30 plant species of which eight occur nowhere else in the state. Over 480 species of vascular plants, representing a third of North Dakota flora, may be found. A count of 209 floristic species, which included prior efforts, were collected in  2014.

See also
Pembina Valley Provincial Park, Manitoba

References

External links
Pembina Gorge State Recreation Area North Dakota Parks and Recreation Department
Pembina Gorge Multi-use Trail Map North Dakota Parks and Recreation Department

State parks of North Dakota
Protected areas of Cavalier County, North Dakota
Protected areas established in 2012
2012 establishments in North Dakota